As part of the British honours system, the Special Honours are issued at the King's pleasure at any given time. The Special Honours confer the award of the Order of the Garter, Order of the Thistle, Order of Merit, Royal Victorian Order and the Order of St John. Life Peers are at times also awarded as special honours.

Life Peer

Conservative Party

 Dr Rosalind Miriam Altmann,  to be Baroness Altmann, of Tottenham in the London Borough of Haringey – 19 May 2015
 Andrew James Dunlop to be Baron Dunlop, of Helensburgh in the County of Dunbarton – 26 May 2015
The Rt Hon. Francis Anthony Aylmer Maude to be Baron Maude of Horsham, of Shipley in the County of West Sussex – 26 May 2015
Dr Terence James "Jim" O'Neill to be Baron O'Neill of Gatley, of Gatley in the County of Greater Manchester – 28 May 2015
James George Robert Bridges,  to be Baron Bridges of Headley, of Headley Heath in the County of Surrey – 28 May 2015
The Hon. David Gifford Leathes Prior, to be Baron Prior of Brampton, of Swannington in the County of Norfolk – 29 May 2015
Richard Sanderson Keen,  to be Baron Keen of Elie, of Elie in the Fife – 8 June 2015

Crossbench

 Sir Robert Walter Kerslake to be Baron Kerslake, of Endcliffe in the City of Sheffield – 20 March 2015

Victoria Cross (VC) 

 Lance Corporal Joshua Leakey – 26 February 2015

George Cross (GC) 

 Colour Sergeant Kevin Howard Haberfield, Royal Marines – 31 July 2015

Order of the Companions of Honour

Companion of the Order of the Companions of Honour (CH) 
Honorary
 Archbishop Emeritus Desmond Mpilo Tutu, for services to UK communities, international peace and reconciliation - 30 November 2015

Knight Bachelor 

 The Rt Hon. Eric Pickles,  – 14 August 2015
 The Hon. Mr Justice Henry James Carr – 10 November 2015
 The Hon. Mr Justice Adrian George Patrick Colton – 10 November 2015
 The Hon. Mr Justice Peter Donald Fraser – 10 November 2015
 The Hon. Mr Justice Andrew James Gilbart – 10 November 2015
 The Hon. Mr Justice David John Holgate – 10 November 2015
 The Hon. Mr Justice Timothy Julian Kerr – 10 November 2015
 The Hon. Mr Justice Alistair William Orchard MacDonald – 10 November 2015
 The Hon. Mr Justice Simon Derek Picken – 10 November 2015
 The Hon. Mr Justice Richard Andrew Snowden – 10 November 2015

Most Honourable Order of the Bath

Knight Grand Cross of the Order of the Bath (GCB) 
Honorary
 Enrique Peña Nieto – President of the United States of Mexico – 3 March 2015
 Joachim Gauck – President of the Federal Republic of Germany – 25 June 2015

Most Distinguished Order of St Michael and St George

Knight Grand Cross of the Order of St Michael and St George (GCMG) 
 His Excellency Samuel Weymouth Tapley Seaton,  – Governor-General of Saint Kitts and Nevis – 24 November 2015

Knight Commander of the Order of St Michael and St George (KCMG) 
 His Honour Judge Howard Andrew Clive Morrison,  – For services to international justice and the rule of law – 26 October 2015

Honorary
 Anders Fogh Rasmussen – 12th Secretary General of the North Atlantic Treaty Organisation - 30 November 2015

 José Antonio Meade Kubireña – Secretary of State for Foreign Affairs of Mexico – 3 March 2015

Companion of the Order of St Michael and St George (CMG) 
Honorary
 Carlos Alberto De Icaza González – Undersecretary of State for Foreign Affairs of Mexico – 3 March 2015

Royal Victorian Order

Knight Commander of the Royal Victorian Order (KCVO) 
 His Royal Highness Prince Henry of Wales – 4 June 2015
 Sir Simon Gerard McDonald,  – 30 June 2015

Honorary
 Diego Gómez Pickering – Ambassador of Mexico to the United Kingdom – 3 March 2015

Commander of the Royal Victorian Order (CVO) 
 Rear Admiral Simon Paul Williams,  – On relinquishment of the appointment of Defence Services Secretary. – 3 March 2015
 Nicholas Pickard – 30 June 2015
 Christopher Jon Martin,  - Principal Private Secretary to the Prime Minister and Director-General of the Prime Minister’s Office. - 1 December 2015
 Robert Haydon Vernon Luke - 8 December 2015

Lieutenant of the Royal Victorian Order (LVO) 
 William Brian Andrews,  – On retirement as Superintendent of the State Apartments, St. James’s Palace. – 24 March 2015
 Peter Ruskin – 30 June 2015
 Susan Jayne Elliott,  – 8 December 2015
 Jonathan Paul Knight – 8 December 2015

Honorary
 David Renato Najera Rivas – Deputy Head of Mission, Embassy of Mexico in the United Kingdom – 3 March 2015
 Aníbal Gómez Toledo – Consul of Mexico, Embassy of Mexico in the United Kingdom – 3 March 2015

Member of the Royal Victorian Order (MVO) 
 William Smith,  – 30 June 2015
 Captain Lok Bahadur Gurung, The Queen’s Gurkha Signals – on relinquishment of his appointment as Queen’s Gurkha Orderly Officer – 4 June 2015
 Captain Prakash Gurung, The Royal Gurkha Rifles – on relinquishment of his appointment as Queen’s Gurkha Orderly Officer – 4 June 2015
 Andrew Hawkes,  – 28 July 2015
 Commander Andrew Canale,  – On relinquishment of his appointment as Equerry to The Queen. – 1 September 2015
 Mark Flanagan – Keeper of the Gardens, Crown Estate, Windsor Great Park – 13 October 2015
 Peter Stephen Walter – On relinquishing the role of Finance and Project Co-ordinator, Master of the Household’s Department, Royal Household – 18 December 2015

Honorary
 Mónica Gabriela Valdez Murphree – Political Affairs Officer, Embassy of Mexico in the United Kingdom – 3 March 2015
 Susana Garduño Arana – Multilateral Affairs Officer, Embassy of Mexico in the United Kingdom – 3 March 2015

Most Excellent Order of the British Empire

Dame Commander of the Order of the British Empire (DBE) 

 The Hon. Mrs Justice Philippa Jane Edwards Whipple – 10 November 2015

Honorary
 Ana Patricia Botín Sanz de Sautuola O'Shea — for services to the financial services sector
 Claudia Ruiz Massieu Salinas – Minister of Tourism of Mexico – 3 March 2015

Knight Commander of the Order of the British Empire (KBE) 
Civil Division
Honorary
 Mark Getty — for services to arts and philanthropy
 Dr. Hermann Hauser,  — for  services to engineering and industry
 Hiroaki Nakanishi — for  services to UK/Japan business cooperation
 Martin Naughton,  —  for services to the Northern Ireland economy, art and philanthropic causes
 Xavier Robert Rolet — for services to the financial services industry and young people
 Kevin Spacey,  — for  services to theatre, arts education and international culture
 Dr. Ralf Dieter Speth — for  services to the British automotive sector
 Luis Miguel Gerónimo Barbosa Huerta – President of the Directive Board of the Senate of Mexico – 3 March 2015
 Luis Videgaray Caso – Secretary of State for Finance and Public Credit of Mexico – 3 March 2015
 Pedro Joaquín Coldwell – Secretary of State for Energy of Mexico – 3 March 2015
 Ildefonso Guajardo Villarreal – Secretary of State for Economy of Mexico – 3 March 2015
 Emilio Chuayffet Chemor – Secretary of State for Public Education of Mexico – 3 March 2015
 Juan José Guerra Abud – Secretary of State for Environment and Natural Resources of Mexico – 3 March 2015
 Aurelio Nuño Mayer – Head of the Presidential Office of Mexico – 3 March 2015

Military Division
Honorary
 General Roberto Miranda Moreno – Presidential Chief of Staff of Mexico – 3 March 2015

Commander of the Order of the British Empire (CBE) 
Military Division
 Brigadier Martin Patrick Mooew, late The Royal Logistic Corps
 Brigadier Paul Anthony Edward Nanson, late The Royal Regiment of Fusiliers
 Colonel David James Lord Swann, late The Queen’s Royal Hussars
 Colonel Gary Paul Wilkinson, late Royal Regiment of Artillery
 Brigadier James Medley Woodham, late The Royal Anglian Regiment
 Brigadier Hugh Hollingworth Blackman, late The Royal Scots Dragoon Guards

Honorary
 Dr Paul Vincent Peter Beresford-Hill, For services to UK/US educational and cultural exchange
 Prof. Rivka Carmi, For services to UK/Israel scientific collaboration
 Mr Tae Young Chung, For services to enhancing the reputation of contemporary British art in Korea and investment in the UK
 James Julian Coleman, 
 Paul Joseph Drechsler, For services to the construction industry
 Karin Birgitta Forseke, For services to the financial services industry
 Mr David Carroll Grevemberg, For services to the Glasgow 2014 Commonwealth Games
 Syed Anwar Hasan, For services to the economy
 Prof. Nathu Ram Puri, For services to business and to charity in the UK and abroad
 Professor Owen Patrick Smith, For services to child and adolescent cancer
 Eitan Wetheimer, For services to UK/Israel business cooperation
 David López Gutiérrez – Head of the Media and Communications Office of the Presidency of Mexico – 3 March 2015
 Enrique Cabrero Mendoza – Director of CONACYT– 3 March 2015
 Rafael Tovar y de Teresa – President of CONACULTA – 3 March 2015

Officer of the Order of the British Empire (OBE) 
Civil Division
Honorary
 Kamal Abu Kalloub, For services to British nationals in Gaza
 Ms Angela Maria Brady, For services to architecture and education
 Mrs Diane Marguerite Briere de Isle Engelhardt, For voluntary and charitable services in Wales
 Etta Cohen, For services to women in business and entrepreneurship
 Dr Randy Lee Comfort. For services to children and families
 Professor Carlos Henrique de Brito Cruz, For services to scientific cooperation between the UK and Brazi
 Mr Patrice Philippe de Martin DE Vivies, For services to Franco-British trade and investment and the energy industry
 Kamal Gherbawi, For services to British interests in Gaza
 Sung-Joo Kim, For services to UK/South Korea business relations and British social causes
 Dr Marion Lyons, For services to public health in Wales
 Mr Denis Mulcahy, For services to peace building and youth development in Northern Ireland
 Joseph Gerard Mulligan, For services to first aid and community resilience
 James Martin O’Callaghan, For services to the construction industry
 Dr Frederik Dag Arfst Paulsen, For services to philanthropy, education, the environment, scientific and historical research and to young people
 Thomas Evert Petri, For services to UK/USA Parliamentary/Congress relations
 Prof. Agostino Pierro, For services to medicine and charity
 Dr Ursula Elisabeth Steingenberger-McEwen, For services to science
 Dr Isolde Louise Victory, For services to Parliament
 Ruby C Wax, For services to mental health
 Professor Winston Wen-young Wong, For services to education and research in the UK and to UK/Taiwan education relations
 Professor Ulrike Andrea Hildegard Zeshan, For services to higher education and the international deaf community
 Jorge Corona Méndez – Assistant Secretary to the President of Mexico – 3 March 2015
 Francisco Guzmán Ortiz – Chief of Staff to the President of Mexico – 3 March 2015
 Juan Manuel Valle Pereña – General Director AMEXICID – 3 March 2015
 Miguel Malvafón Andrade – Director General for Protocol – 3 March 2015
 Alejandro Negrín Muñoz  – Director General for Europe – 3 March 2015

Military Division
 Acting Colonel Jaimie Fraser Roylance, Royal Marines
 Lieutenant Colonel Andrew Derek Griffiths Adjutant General’s Corps (Staff and Personnel Support Branch)
 Major Neil Alexander Kelly, The Mercian Regiment
 Lieutenant Colonel David Brian Kenny, The Royal Irish Regiment
 Lieutenant Colonel Richard Oliver Slack, 9th/12th Royal Lancers
 Wing Commander James Peter Penelhum, Royal Air Force
 Commander Daniel Clarke, Royal Navy
 Commander Michael Daren Smith, Royal Navy
 Captain Michael Keith Utley, Royal Navy
 Lieutenant Colonel Benedict Peter Norman Ramsay, Welsh Guards
 Lieutenant Colonel Graeme Crichton Wearmouth, The Royal Regiment of Scotland

Honorary
 General Gumaro Cabrera Osornio – Deputy Head of Logistics of the Presidential Guard of Mexico – 3 March 2015
 General Enrique García Jaramillo – Coordinator of Sports Promotion of the Presidential Guard of Mexico – 3 March 2015

Member of the Order of the British Empire (MBE) 
Military Division
 Major Thomas Armstrong Scott Ryall, Royal Marines
 Staff Sergeant Lee Edwin Allen, Intelligence Corps
 Corporal Adam Ronald Peter Butler, Corps of Royal Engineers
 Captain Edward Philip Challis, The Royal Regiment of Scotland
 Major Duane Joseph Fletcher, Queen Alexandra’s Royal Army Nursing Corps
 Captain Duncan Mark Knox, The Parachute Regiment
 Captain Declan John Lynn, Adjutant General’s Corps (Educational and Training Services Branch)
 Major Jeremy Dawson Walters, Royal Regiment of Artillery
 Flight Lieutenant Emma Dutton, Royal Air Force
 Warrant Officer Class 1 Samuel George Doak, Royal Marines
 Lieutenant Wendy Frame, Royal Navy
 Commander Philip John Hally, Royal Navy
 Lieutenant Commander Steven Nicholas Wall, Royal Navy
 Captain Mark Edward Acklam, The Royal Corps of Signals
 Acting Lieutenant Colonel Jeremy Charles William Mawdsley, Royal Regiment of Artillery
 Acting Lieutenant Colonel Michael Richard Nigel Syewart, Irish Guards
 Squadron Leader Calvin George Bailey, Royal Air Force

Honorary
 Dr Mohammed Ahmed Abdul Razzaq Alahmed, For services to the British community in Qatar
 Brother Seon Jae An, For services to the Royal Asiatic Society and to furthering the study of English Literature in Korea
 Maria Victoria Buenaventura
 Mary Theresa Ceesay
 Patrick Dominick Cregg
 Mrs Charlotte Phyllis Anne Joelle Marie Cunningham, For services to children and young people
 Sister Rita Dawson, 
 Gabriele Elisabeth Franklin
 Mrs Mandy Maureen Goddard, For services to children and families
 Ms Nazli Hamitoglu, For services to Consular support to victims of rape and sexual assault in Turkey
 Aaron Matthew Holtz, For services to the promotion of British values at the United Nations
 Ms Ayan Mahamoud Mahamed, For services to promoting friendship and cultural understanding between the UK and Somali region
 Miss Isabel Munoz, For services to disabled people and disabled access
 Agustin Navarrp Alvado, For services to the British community in Benidorm
 Ming Gek Ng (Mindy Tay), For services to British commercial interests in Singapore
 Agamemnon Otero, For services to the community energy sector
 Mrs Graciela Pena Perez, For services to British visitors to Cancun and the Riviera Maya, Mexico
 Clarinda Justina Salandy, For services to carnival design
 Joanna Hannah Basilio Teh, For services to British nationals in the Philippines during Typhoon Haiyan
 Petr Torak, For services to the Roma community in Peterborough
 Suha Zeidan, For services to British nationals in the Occupied Palestinian Territories
 Julio César Guerrero Martin  – Private Secretary for the Secretary of State for Foreign Affairs of Mexico – 3 March 2015
 Héctor Agustín Ortega Nieto – Chief of Staff to the Undersecretary for Foreign Affairs of Mexico – 3 March 2015

British Empire Medal (BEM) 

 Colin Taylor, For services to the Homeless Community. – 13 March 2015

Honorary
 Zergaw Asfera Andarge, For services to the British Embassy, Khartoum
 Drew Henry Avery
 Mrs Mary Margaret Daly, For services to the Butterfly Appeal Campaign for Multiple Sclerosis Therapy and to the community in Ashford, Kent
 Olga Clara Denyer
 Mary-Rose Egan
 Major (Retired) Yambahadur Gurung
 Abdullah Kuce, For services to the security of the British Consulate-General, Istanbul
 Frederick Alphonsus McDwyer
 Anne Eileen MC Mahon
 Mr Bernard Désiré Ernest Potaux, For services to UK/French relations and remembrance
 Woon Young Song
 Isabel Maria Lopes Spencer
 Hisako Zafar - for services to Business and to the Asian community.

Companion of the Distinguished Service Order (DSO) 

Lieutenant Colonel James Rowland Martin, The Princess of Wales’s Royal Regiment
 Major Thomas Robson McDermott, The Royal Tank Regiment
 Lieutenant Colonel James Christopher Roddis, ,The Royal Regiment of Scotland

Military Cross (MC) 

 Staff Sergeant Paul Jonathon Billingham, Royal Marines
 Captain William Andrew Hall, Royal Regiment of Artillery
 Major Angus Myles Arthur Tilney, The King’s Royal Hussars

Distinguished Flying Cross (DFC) 

 Flight Lieutenant Laura Alice Hilary Nicholson, Royal Air Force

Air Force Cross (AFC) 

 Flight Lieutenant Edward Thomas Berwick, Royal Air Force
 Flight Lieutenant Timothy Neil Eeddy, Royal Air Force
 Lieutenant Commander Christopher Torben Gotke, Royal Navy
 Flight Lieutenant Ian McIver Campbell, Royal Air Force

Queen's Fire Service Medal (QFSM) 

Dale Anthony Ashford, Assistant Chief Fire Officer, Northern Ireland Fire and Rescue Service. – 6 February 2015

Queen's Gallantry Medal (QGM) 

 Paul Lye – 6 February 2015
 Corporal Jonathan Mckeag, Royal Marines
 Petty Officer Aircrewman Russell James Adams, Royal Navy
 Sergeant Daniel Martin Allanson, Royal Air Force

Royal Red Cross 

Associate Royal Red Cross (ARRC)
 Leading Naval Nurse Laura Jane Fallon, Queen Alexandra’s Royal Naval Nursing Staff
 Squadron Leader Charlotte Joanne Thompson-Edgar, Princess Mary’s Royal Air Force Nursing Service

Mentioned in Despatches 

 Colour Sergeant Ruairi Dwyer, Royal Marines
 Sergeant Christopher Stephen Browne, 9th/12th Royal Lancers
 Lance Corporal James Lee Brynin, Intelligence Corps (killed in action)
 Lance Sergeant Glenn Clarke, Coldstream Guards
 Lance Corporal Luke Oliver Pratley Forshaw, Coldstream Guards
 Captain William Alan Fry, 9th/12th Royal Lancers
 Captain Alasdair John Grant, 9th/12th Royal Lancers
 Staff Sergeant Stuart Hollis, 9th/12th Royal Lancers
 Captain James Richard Howlin, Coldstream Guards
 Lance Corporal Jamie Mccappin, Royal Regiment of Artillery
 Captain Edward Gervase Colyer Monckton, 9th/12th Royal Lancers
 Corporal Jonathan William Oliver, 9th/12th Royal Lancers
 Lieutenant (now Captain) Luke Joshua Wadman, Royal Regiment of Artillery
 Lance Corporal Lewis Stevenson, Royal Air Force

Queen’s Commendation for Bravery 
 Warrant Officer Class 1 Simon James William Hsll, The Royal Logistic Corps
 Private John Steven Pyatt-Payne, The Mercian Regiment
 Petty Officer (Diver) Richard Anthony Brown, Royal Navy
 Lieutenant Commander Robin Leslie Suckling, Royal Navy
 Corporal Alexander Harries, Adjutant General’s Corps (Royal Military Police)
 Officer Cadet Frances Margaret Emma Townend, University Officer Training Corps Army Reserve

Queen's Commendation for Valuable Service 

 Major Bruce William Drysdale Anderson, Royal Marines
 Lieutenant Commander Bradley Lawrence Watson, Royal Navy
 Lieutenant Paul Donald White, Royal Navy
 Staff Sergeant James Batten, Intelligence Corps
 Colonel Barry William Bennett, late Royal Regiment of Artillery
 Major Samuel George Cooke, The Royal Logistic Corps
 Lieutenant Colonel Stephen Weatherley Davies, Corps of Royal Engineers
 Acting Major Darren Paul Elsey, The Princess of Wales’s Royal Regiment
 Corporal Ricky Vincent Fleet, Corps of Royal Electrical and Mechanical Engineers Army Reserve
 Major Jeremy Francis Giles, The Royal Regiment of Scotland
 Major Gordon Grieve, Royal Regiment of Artillery
 Staff Sergeant Robert Charles Horton, The Parachute Regiment
 Lieutenant Colonel Alexander Graham Johnson, Royal Army Medical Corps
 Lance Corporal Benjamin Johnson, Intelligence Corps
 Lieutenant Colonel Nigel Alan Johnson, The Royal Anglian Regiment
 Major Mark Stuart Jones, Corps of Royal Engineers
 Private Carl David Lester, The Royal Logistic Corps
 Colonel Nicholas John Lock, late The Royal Welsh
 Staff Sergeant Kate Elizabeth Lord, Royal Army Physical Training Corps
 Brigadier Neil Marshall, late Royal Regiment of Artillery
 Warrant Officer Class 2 Mark Mcdougall, Corps of Royal Engineers
 Corporal Stuart Johnathan Mcintosh-Mckeown, Royal Army Medical Corps
 Major Alexander Robert Mckay, The Mercian Regiment
 Major James Fraser Stuart Mcleman, The Royal Scots Dragoon Guards
 Acting Colonel John Robert Mead, Royal Regiment of Artillery
 Major Adam Svend Morris, Royal Army Medical Corps
 Sergeant Steven David Nixon, The Parachute Regiment
 Acting Captain Marcus Ian Pemberton, The Royal Regiment of Scotland
 Acting Lieutenant Colonel Andrew Robert Redding, The Parachute Regiment
 Lance Corporal Scott Robertson, The Royal Corps of Signals
 Warrant Officer Class 1 Nigel James Rogan, The Royal Corps of Signals
 Corporal Aaron Neil Ruffell, Intelligence Corps
 Lieutenant Colonel Bilal Muhammad Siddique, Adjutant General’s Corps (Army Legal Services Branch)
 Private Benjamin Charles Spittle, Royal Army Medical Corps Army Reserve
 Lieutenant Colonel Andrew Terence Stewart, The Royal Scots Dragoon Guards
 Major Gary Tait, The Royal Regiment of Scotland
 Lieutenant Hayden John Geoffrey Taylor, Intelligence Corps
 Acting Major Derek Francis William Tickner, Royal Regiment of Artillery
 Colonel Thomas George Vallings, late The Yorkshire Regiment
 Captain Richard Simon Wood, The Parachute Regiment
 Corporal Michael Terence Wright, Intelligence Corps
 Air Commodore John Charles Besell, Royal Air Force
 Acting Flight Lieutenant Stephen Derek Burr, Royal Air Force
 Wing Commander Piers Timothy Westcott Holland, Royal Air Force
 Flight Sergeant Richard Webster Selina, Royal Air Force
 C2 Jamie Darling, Contractor
 Major Paul James Stewart, Army Air Corps
 Captain Robert James Astley Bellfield, Royal Navy
 Warrant Officer 2 Engineering Technician (Marine Engineering) Kris Leslie Chard, Royal Navy
 Lieutenant Commander Edwin Sigurd Cooper, Royal Navy
 Able Seaman (Communications SM) 1 Matthew William Harriss, Royal Navy
 Sergeant Dean Jones, Royal Marines
 Chief Petty Officer Logistics (Supply Chain) Kenneth Murray Kennedy, Royal Navy
 Lieutenant Commander Matthew John Kent, Royal Navy
 Chief Petty Officer Warfare Specialist (Abovewater Warfare Tactical) Darren Lennon, Royal Navy
 Lieutenant Commander Charles Ian Maynard, Royal Navy
 Lieutenant Aleesha Wendy Mitchell, Royal Navy
 Lieutenant David Samuel Starkey, Royal Navy
 Lieutenant Graeme Hamish Walker, Royal Navy
 Major Kevin Finlay Walls, Royal Marines
 Lieutenant Colonel Benedict Holland Goddard Campbell-Colquhoun, Corps of Royal Engineers
 Corporal Lisa Michelle Dawson, The Royal Corps of Signals
 Major Jonathan Lee Gilbody, The Duke of Lancaster’s Regiment
 Corporal Karl Dominic Page, The Royal Corps of Signals Army Reserve
 Colonel Stuart Rokeby Roberts, Late The Royal Logistic Corps
 Sergeant Kevin Carver, Royal Air Force
 Warrant Officer Mark Evans, Royal Air Force
 Flight Sergeant Samantha Jane Green, Royal Air Force
 Squadron Leader Paul Thomas Hamilton, Royal Air Force

Order of St John

Knight of the Order of St John 

 Professor Roger Julian Berry,  – 16 February 2015
 The Right Honourable The Lord Aberdare,  – 16 March 2015
 William Sands Sommerville – 16 March 2015
 Sir Paul Michael Williams,  – 16 March 2015
 His Excellency General The Honourable David Hurley,  – 17 March 2015
 The Reverend John James Davis,  – 26 March 2015
 Michael Messinger,  – 26 March 2015
 Major General Mark Strudwick,  – 21 May 2015
 Stephen John Sieling – 21 May 2015
 Jack Martin Enoch Jr – 24 July 2015
 Doctor James Parker McCulley – 21 May 2015
 Paul White McKee – 21 May 2015
 The Reverend Andrew Craig Mead,  – 21 May 2015
 Ivan Sergeivitch Poutiatine – 21 May 2015
 John Demarest Van Wagoner – 21 May 2015
 James McIlhenny Wintersteen – 21 May 2015
 Nigel John Bewley Atkison – 2 December 2015
 The Right Honourable The Lord Mountevans,  – 2 December 2015
 Craig Leslie Hartley – 2 December 2015
 Ricardo Kleinhans – 2 December 2015
 Joseph John Morrow,  – 2 December 2015
 David Watson – 2 December 2015

Dame of the Order of St John
 Fiona Mary Wilson Crighton – 16 March 2015
 The Honourable Virginia Lovell,  – 26 March 2015
 Elizabeth Ann Peterson Prien – 21 May 2015
 Jeanette Gesina Johanna Faurie – 2 December 2015
 Katharine Margaret Ella Liston – 2 December 2015

Commander of the Order of St John 

 Brigadier David Ainsworth Harrison,  – 16 February 2015
 Terence Edward Walton,  – 16 February 2015
 Kim Lorraine Yeats – 16 February 2015
 Edmund Seymour Bailey – 16 March 2015
 John Connelly Dewar – 16 March 2015
 Captain Stuart Crawford Macbride – 16 March 2015
 Lesley Marian Macdonald – 16 March 2015
John Raymond Brownsell – 26 March 2015
Duncan Ian Callaghan – 26 March 2015
 Janet Margaret Baker – 26 March 2015
 The Reverend Philip John Carrington,  – 21 May 2015
 Christopher Murdock – 21 May 2015
 Jean Elizabeth Smith – 21 May 2015
 Elizabeth Mary Witt – 21 May 2015
 Darren James Bartholomew
 Ian Angus Campbell
 Patrick Joseph Halpin
 Gavin Melvin Jensen
 Dato’ Ng Keng Joo
 Alexander Graham Randall
 Eric Clive Wolhuter
 Dudleigh Eve Anderson
 Audrey Patricia McLennan

Officer of the Order of St John 

 Dean Peter de la Mare
 Jonathan Nicolas Dexter
 Roderick Gray
 Graham Wilfred Benjamin Green
 Alan Hartley, MBE
 Allan-Bryan Hattingh
 John William Hougham, CBE
 Robin James Varwell Marlow
 Anthony James McGuirk, CBE QFSM
 Lieutenant Colonel Richard McQueen
 James Patrick Morgan
 Trevor Charles Moss
 His Grace The Duke of Atholl – 2 December 2015
 Alan James Popplewell
 Thomas Sefton, MBE
 Dr Ahmad Tajuddin Bin Mohamad Nor
 Tan Beng Lee
 Dato’ Sri Tee Boon Kee
 Wayne Tritton
 James Anthony Warlow
 Carl David Wheeler
 Clare Lorraine Crook
 Shirley Anne Day
 Veronica Novel Desilva
 Miss Moira DE Swardt
 Sally Elliott
 Kathryn Lawman
 Jane Marlow
 Christine Brenda McIntyre
 Elaine Kitty Smith
 Ms Hendrika Petronella Marjan van der Slik
 Julie Dawn Warlow
 Pamela Mary Wood

References 

Special Honours
2015 awards in the United Kingdom
British honours system